The Hyblaean Mountains is a mountain range in south-eastern Sicily, Italy. It straddles the provinces of Ragusa, Syracuse and Catania. The highest peak of the range is Monte Lauro, at 986 m.

History
The name derives from the Siculi king Hyblon, who gave a portion of his territory to Greek colonists to build the town of Megara Hyblaea.

Geology
The range is composed of white limestone rocks, characterized by Karst topography. Originally a plateau, rivers have eroded the landscape, forming numerous deep canyons. In the coastal area sandstone is also present. In some areas, such as that of Monte Lauro (once part of a submerged volcanic complex), volcanic rocks are also present. The hyblaean area is characterized by a high seismic risk.

Landscape
The Hyblaean Mountains are characterized by gentle slopes, interrupted by sharp valleys. In the central area are numerous woods which are intermingled with dry stone walls of typical of south-eastern Sicily. The more populated coastal area is characterised by terraced hills with Mediterranean vegetation, rising up to a plateau cultivated by olive trees, vines, citrus fruit and almonds. Other crops include grain and maize.

Hyblaean Mountains host the archaeological remains of the medieval castles of Ferla, Buscemi and Cassaro. Their discovery is relatively recent and mainly due to the archaeological campaign held in the area from 2011 to 2013.

Main sights
Main attractions of the area include the Baroque towns of Ragusa, Modica and Palazzolo Acreide, the Necropolis of Pantalica and Cava Ispica.

Peaks
The main peaks of the Monti Iblei are:
 Monte Lauro 986m
 Monte Casale 910m
 Monte Arcibessi 907m
 Serra Brugio 870m
 Monte Raci 610m
 Monte Racello 530m
 Monti Climiti 410m

Rivers

The range is drained by several rivers, which flow into either the Mediterranean Sea or the Ionian sea.

References

Bibliography
 

Mountain ranges of Italy
Province of Ragusa
Hyblaean
Hyblaean